Border Gezi (December 17, 1964 – April 28, 2001) was a Zimbabwean politician. He was a close ally of Robert Mugabe within ZANU-PF and served as Minister for Gender, Youth and Employment from 2000 having previously been a provincial governor.

Gezi was brought up in Mvurwi and attended Holy Rosary Secondary School. He first worked as an accounts clerk for the Zimbabwe Electricity Supply Authority before being elected to the House of Assembly of Zimbabwe for Muzarabani in the 1990 elections. In 1993 he was elected as ZANU-PF chairman for Mashonaland Central, and the government appointed him Provincial Governor from 1996.

At the 2000 parliamentary election, Gezi was in charge of recruiting and organising groups of young ZANU-PF supporters into a militia. The militia groups he led were implicated in violent attacks on supporters of the Movement for Democratic Change, and in invasions of white-owned farms. At a special ZANU-PF congress later that year, Gezi was appointed Secretary for the Commissariat, with responsibility for organizing Robert Mugabe's re-election as President two years later.

Gezi won the Bindura seat at the 2000 election and was appointed as Minister for Gender, Youth and Employment. He was identified as a close ally of Robert Mugabe who had the potential to hold high office in the future. However, he was killed when his Mercedes-Benz E-Class W210 skidded off the Harare-Masvingo road  after bursting a tyre and crashed into numerous Eucalyptus trees on 28 April 2001.

References
 Minister Border Gezi dies (ZBC)

1964 births
2001 deaths
Zimbabwe African National Liberation Army personnel
ZANU–PF politicians
Members of the National Assembly of Zimbabwe
Government ministers of Zimbabwe
Provincial governors of Zimbabwe
Road incident deaths in Zimbabwe
People from Mashonaland Central Province